Aerial China (Chinese: 航拍中国), also known as Bird's-eye China, is a Chinese documentary television series showcasing the country's landscape via only aerial videos. It aimed to consist of a total of 34 episodes and cover all of China’s 23 provinces, five autonomous regions, four municipalities and two special administrative regions.

The first four episodes of the first season was aired in January 2017 on CCTV-9, the rest of the season was aired in March. A second season was aired in 2019 from March 3, 2019 to March 9 on CCTV-1 and CCTV-9. The third season was aired since May 21, 2020 on CCTV-1 and CCTV-9. The fourth season will air since Nov 7, 2022 on CCTV-1 and CCTV-9.

Episodes

Season One

Season Two

Season Three

Season Four

References 

Chinese television shows
2010s Chinese television series
Chinese documentary television series
China Central Television original programming